Stella Ahono is a Kenyan footballer who plays as a goalkeeper for Zetech Sparks FC and the Kenya women's national team.

Early life
Ahono hails from the Kakamega County.

International career
Ahono capped for Kenya at senior level during the 2020 Turkish Women's Cup.

See also
List of Kenya women's international footballers

References

Year of birth missing (living people)
Living people
People from Kakamega County
Kenyan women's footballers
Women's association football goalkeepers
Kenya women's international footballers